The 2013–14 Hong Kong FA Cup was the 39th edition of Hong Kong FA Cup. It was a knockout competition for all the teams of the 2013–14 Hong Kong First Division League. Unlike the previous season, the format will change back into a single-legged competition.

It will be the first time since the 2008–09 edition that lower divisions teams are involved in the competition. 4 teams from the preliminary round will be qualified for the proper round.

The winner will guarantee a place in the 2013–14 Hong Kong Season Play-off.

Teams 

Note:
1 4 teams that reach preliminary semi-finals are qualified for the proper round of the cup. Therefore, the 3rd place playoff and the final do not affect the number of clubs remaining.
2 These 4 winners are from Preliminary Semi-finals.

Preliminary round

Fixtures and results

Bracket

Round of 16

Quarter-finals

Semi-finals

Final

Scorer
The scorers in the 2013–14 Hong Kong FA Cup are as follows:

2 goals

  Detinho (Citizen)
  Dylan Macallister (Eastern Salon)
  Andrew Barisić (South China)
  Michel Lugo (Sunray Cave JC Sun Hei)
  Reinaldo (Sunray Cave JC Sun Hei)
  Zhang Jun (Sunray Cave JC Sun Hei)

1 goal

  Chuck Yiu Kwok (Biu Chun Rangers)
  Luciano Silva (Biu Chun Rangers)
  Paulinho (Citizen)
  Liang Zicheng (Eastern Salon)
  Li Haiqiang (Eastern Salon)
  Wong Sheung Choi (Kwai Tsing)
  Ngan Lok Fung (Royal Southern)
  Saša Kajkut (South China)
  Cheung Kwok Ming (Sunray Cave JC Sun Hei)
  Yrel Cedrique Arnaud Bouet (Sunray Cave JC Sun Hei)
  Wong Chun Hin (Sunray Cave JC Sun Hei)
  Ju Yingzhi (Sun Pegasus)
  Jaimes McKee (Sun Pegasus)
  Kenji Fukuda (Yokohama FC Hong Kong)

References

External links
FA Cup - Hong Kong Football Association

Fa Cup
Hong Kong FA Cup
2014